The 2013 Valencian Community motorcycle Grand Prix was the eighteenth and final round of the 2013 MotoGP season. It was held at the Circuit Ricardo Tormo in Valencia on 10 November 2013.

Marc Márquez became MotoGP world champion in his rookie season, becoming the first rider to do so since Kenny Roberts in 1978.

Maverick Viñales became Moto3 world champion in the last corner of the season, after a battle with Moto3 runner-up Álex Rins.

Classification

MotoGP

Moto2

Moto3

Championship standings after the race (MotoGP)
Below are the standings for the top five riders and constructors after round eighteen has concluded.

Riders' Championship standings

Constructors' Championship standings

 Note: Only the top five positions are included for both sets of standings.

References

Valencian Community motorcycle Grand Prix
Valencian
Valencian motorcycle
21st century in Valencia
Valencian motorcycle Grand Prix